Richard Mitchelson Campbell  (28 August 1897 – 17 November 1974) was a New Zealand economist, civil servant (holding the position of Chairman of the Public Service Commissioner), and diplomat.

After accompanying Walter Nash to Britain and Europe, from 1940 to 1945 he had an unhappy period as Secretary of the New Zealand High Commission in London, as Campbell and the High Commissioner, ex-politician Bill Jordan hated each other.

He served as Acting High Commissioner to the United Kingdom in 1958 following five years as the official secretary.

He was appointed a Companion of the Order of St Michael and St George in the 1953 Coronation Honours. He also received the Queen Elizabeth II Coronation Medal.

References

 

1897 births
1974 deaths
New Zealand public servants
New Zealand Companions of the Order of St Michael and St George
High Commissioners of New Zealand to the United Kingdom